Robert Mitchell (December 30, 1778November 13, 1848) was a member of the United States House of Representatives from Ohio.

Mitchell was born in Westmoreland County, Pennsylvania.  He studied medicine before he moved to Ohio in 1807.  Mitchell practiced medicine in Zanesville, Ohio, and later held various positions in Muskingum County.  He served in the War of 1812 in John De Vault's company.

From 1815 to 1817 Mitchell was a member of the Ohio House of Representatives.  He then served as a judge of the court of common pleas. In 1822 he held the rank of brigadier general in the Ohio Militia.

He was elected to represent Ohio's 12th congressional district (Licking and Muskingum Counties) in Congress in 1832.  He lost his bid for reelection in 1834 and then returned to the practice of medicine.

Sources

Martis, Kenneth C. Historical Atlas of Political Parties in Congress. (New York: MacMillan, 1989) p. 92

1778 births
1848 deaths
Members of the Ohio House of Representatives
People from Westmoreland County, Pennsylvania
People from Zanesville, Ohio
Physicians from Ohio
American military personnel of the War of 1812
American militia generals
Jacksonian members of the United States House of Representatives from Ohio
19th-century American politicians